Velabisht is a village and a former municipality in Berat County, central Albania. At the 2015 local government reform it became a subdivision of the municipality Berat. The population at the 2011 census was 8,453. A old Ottoman bridge is located inside the village.

References

Former municipalities in Berat County
Administrative units of Berat
Villages in Berat County
Populated places disestablished in 2015